Channel 36 refers to several television stations:

Canada
The following television stations broadcast on digital or analog channel 36 (UHF frequencies covering 603.25-607.75 MHz) in Canada:
 CHNE-TV in Chéticamp, Nova Scotia
 CITS-DT in Burlington, Ontario
 CKWS-TV-3 in Smiths Falls, Ontario

The following television stations operate on virtual channel 36 in Canada:
 CITS-DT in Burlington, Ontario

Philippines
 Central Luzon Television 36, Pampanga.

Vietnam
DN1-RTV, Dong Nai

See also
 Channel 36 TV stations in Mexico
 Channel 36 digital TV stations in the United States
 Channel 36 virtual TV stations in the United States
 Channel 36 low-power TV stations in the United States

36